Manochitra (born 5 March 1997) is an Indian actress who has appeared in Tamil, Malayalam, Kannada, and Telugu films.

Career 
She then met the Casting Director Thangaraj Lakshminarayanan  at the Kancheepuram Kamakshi temple and he requested her to star opposite Jai in his next venture. During the production of Aval Peyar Thamizharasi, where she played the title role, the director Meera Kathiravan asked the actress to avoid interviews and to be kept away from the promotional activity to maintain the suspense of her identity till the audio launch of the film. She was credited as Nandhagi. The film became an average grosser at the box office but won critical acclaim and she was nominated for the Vijay Award for Best Debut Actress. The actress then re-christened herself to her birthname Manochitra. She soon after the release began working on a project titled Thandavakone with debutante director Ganesh as well as Ithanai Naalai Engirundai with R. Balu opposite Ananda Kannan. However, neither of the films have been released and remain stuck in the production phase. Another film titled Kalingathu Parani with Vimal was also shelved halfway through production after the producer ran out of funds.

In 2012, Manochitra played a supporting role in Seenu Ramasamy's Neerparavai. In 2014, she made a comeback featuring in the multi-starrer Netru Indru alongside Prasanna and Vimal and she also acted in the action film Veeram directed by Siva. Manochitra made her debut in Telugu cinema with Malligadu Marriage Bureau (2014) in which she paired with Telugu actor Srikanth and in Malayalam cinema with Pianist (2014). Manochitra then signed to play in Oru Vaanavil Poley, the remake of Pianist, and the Telugu film Nattu Kodi. Both films remained unreleased for unknown reasons. In 2016, she acted in Andaman (2016) where she was paired with actor Richard Rishi.

Filmography 
All films are in Tamil, unless otherwise noted.

References

External links 
 

Actresses in Telugu cinema
Actresses in Tamil cinema
Living people
Actresses in Malayalam cinema
Indian film actresses
21st-century Indian actresses
Actresses from Tamil Nadu
People from Kanchipuram district
1995 births